The 2014–15 season is Beitar Jerusalem's 46th season in the Israeli Premier League.

First team

Summer transfers

Winter transfers

Pre-season and friendlies

Ligat Ha'Al (Premier League)

Fixtures
The whole season was postponed due to war

League table

Results summary

Top playoff

Table

Results summary

Results by round

League goalscorers per round

State Cup

Fixtures

Goalscorers

1 goal
  Shlomi Azulay
  Claudemir Ferreira da Silva
  Dušan Matović

Toto Cup

Group stage

Goalscorers

2 goals
  Lidor Cohen
1 goal
  Omer Atzili
  Ze'ev Haimovich

References

External links
 Beitar Jerusalem website

Beitar Jerusalem F.C. seasons
Beitar Jerusalem